Parapachygone is a monotypic genus of flowering plants belonging to the family Menispermaceae. The only species is Parapachygone longifolia.

Its native range is Queensland.

References

Menispermaceae
Menispermaceae genera
Monotypic Ranunculales genera